Dr. Caoilfhionn Nic Pháidín is an author and academic, previously of Dublin City University, Dublin, Ireland. She served on the government agency Coimisiún na Gaeltachta (The Gaeltacht Commission) from 2000 to 2002. She is also a co-founder of the Irish language publishing firm Cois Life.

Nic Pháidín has an M.A. and Ph.D. in Irish from University College Dublin.  She has held editing and research positions at An Gúm, Comhar, the Department of Education, The Irish Times, and The Royal Irish Academy. She was the Director of Fiontar, an Irish language school in Dublin City University, from 1996–2006 and a Senior Lecturer in the School until 2015. She has been an Irish language consultant for the Oxford English Dictionary since 1985. She is also series editor of the monograph series Lúb ar Phár. Her research interests include the development of Gaeltachts (Irish speaking areas) in Ireland, the contemporary development of the Irish language, and twentieth century print media.

In 1995, Nic Pháidín co-founded Cois Life, an Irish language academic and literary publisher, along with Seán Ó Cearnaigh. She is currently the co-director of Cois Life. Cois Life receives funding from The Arts Council of Ireland and Clár na Leabhar Gaeilge.

Nic Pháidín was a member of Coimisiún na Gaeltachta from 2000 to 2002. Coimisiún na Gaeltachta was a government agency appointed to provide recommendations on how to strengthen the role of Irish in Gaeltacht communities.

Publications
Books by Caoilfhionn Nic Pháidín include:
 
 
 
 
 
 
As editor: 
 Caoilfhionn Nic Pháidín (ed.) (2016) Séanna. Cois Life. .
 Caoilfhionn Nic Pháidín, Seán Ó Cearnaigh (2008) (eds.) A New View of the Irish Language. Cois Life. .
 Caoilfhionn Nic Phaidín (ed.) (1996) Séanna. Cois Life. .

References
Dr. Caoilfhionn Nic Pháidín.

Specific

External links
Dublin City University: Caoilfhionn Nic Pháidín.

Academics of Dublin City University
Irish-language writers
Year of birth missing (living people)
Living people
20th-century Irish women writers
21st-century Irish women writers